The 150th Fighter-Bomber Aviation Regiment (150. ловачко-бомбардерски авијацијски пук) was an aviation regiment established in 1952 as part of the SFR Yugoslav Air Force. The regimental headquarters was stationed at Niš Airport until the regiment was disbanded in 1958.

History
The 150th Fighter-Bomber Aviation Regiment was formed on 1 February 1952, pursuant to an order issued on 7 December 1951, with its command at Niš Airport. The regiment was part of the 29th Aviation Division. It consisted of one squadron equipped with US-built F-47D Thunderbolt fighter aircraft. It was disbanded by the beginning of 1958, with its aircraft, personnel and equipment transferred to other units of the 29th Aviation Division.

Assignments
29th Aviation Division (1952–1958)

Commanding officers

Aircraft
P-47/F-47D Thunderbolt

References

Regiments of Yugoslav Air Force
Military units and formations established in 1952
Military units and formations disestablished in 1958